Mawcarse railway station served the hamlet of Mawcarse, Perth and Kinross, Scotland from 1858 to 1964 on the Fife and Kinross Line.

History 
The station opened on 15 March 1858 by the North British Railway. It was rebuilt in 1890 and opened as Mawcarse Junction when the Glenfarg Line opened. The signal box opened around this time and was to the west of the station. To the north was the goods yard which had a saw mill siding. The station's name was changed back to Mawcarse in 1962. It closed on 15 June 1964.

References

External links 

Disused railway stations in Perth and Kinross
Former North British Railway stations
Beeching closures in Scotland
Railway stations in Great Britain opened in 1890
Railway stations in Great Britain closed in 1964
1890 establishments in Scotland
1964 disestablishments in Scotland